The Bahrain national under-17 football team is the selection of under 17 players who represent the Bahrain Football Association for two years in competition. They have once been finalists in the AFC U-16 Championship and once finished fourth at the FIFA U-17 World Cup.

Al Ahmar have been successful at FIFA U-17 World Cup way back in 1989 where they topped group A beating the likes of Cuba & Ghana by 3-0 & 1-0 margins respectively, they drew Scotland 1–1 at their final group stage game which helped them to top their group. Later in Quarterfinals they defeated Brazil at penalties and lost to Saudi Arabia in semifinal hence ending their maiden FIFA U-17 World Cup on a high note by finishing 4th. They played only one more world cup since then (in 1997) where they finished 3rd in their group winning only one game.

Bahrain enjoyed the success in AFC U-16 competitions as well. Their best result came in 1988 where they finished as runners up losing to Saudi Arabia in final. After failing to qualify in 1990 edition, they qualified for the next 4 editions until 1998, but this time, the best they could achieve was 3rd place in 1996 & 1998 editions.

Since 2000 edition until 2018 Bahrain failed to qualify for AFC U-16 Championship, but AFC awarded them hosting rights for 2020 edition of AFC U-16 Championship.

Recent Results & Fixtures

U-16
2019 WAFF U-15 Championship

2020 AFC U-16 Championship qualification

2020 AFC U-16 Championship

Performance at the AFC U-17 Asian Cup 

 Red border color indicates tournament was held on home soil.

Competitive history

FIFA U-17 World Cup

Honours
FIFA U-17 World Cup
4th Place: (1989 FIFA U-16 World Championship)
AFC U-16 Championship
 Runners up(1) : (1988 AFC U-16 Championship)
 Third Place(2) : (1996 AFC U-17 Championship, 1998 AFC U-17 Championship)
 4th Place(1) : (1994 AFC U-17 Championship)

See also 
Bahrain national football team
AFC U-16 Championship
FIFA U-17 World Cup

Asian national under-17 association football teams
Under-17